John Baragrey (April 15, 1918 – August 4, 1975) was an American film, television, and stage actor who appeared in virtually every dramatic television series of the 1950s and early 1960s.

Early years
Baragrey was born in Haleyville, Alabama, and graduated from the University of Alabama in 1939.

He met his wife actress Louise Larabee, while touring with USO shows during World War II.

Career
Baragrey gained early acting experience in stock theater, beginning in 1946 when he joined a stock company headed by José Ferrer. His other stock work included the Bucks County Playhouse, Philadelphia's Playhouse in the Park, and Westport Country Playhouse.

On stage, in films, and especially on television, he teamed up with many of the leading ladies of the era, including Rita Hayworth, Jane Wyman, Jane Powell, Anne Bancroft, Judith Anderson, Tallulah Bankhead, Dolores del Río, and Bette Davis. Yet today he is virtually forgotten, partly because so much of his work was in early television, and many of the tapes of these shows have been lost or were never even recorded.

Personal life and death
On August 4, 1975, Baragrey died at his home in New York City at the age of 57.

Filmography

Film

 The Loves of Carmen (1948) - Lucas
 The Creeper (1948) - Dr. John Reade
 The Saxon Charm (1948) - Peter Stanhope (uncredited)
 Shockproof (1949) - Harry Wesson
 Swiss Tour (1950) - Jack
 Tall Man Riding (1955) - Cibo Pearlo
 Pardners (1956 - Dan Hollis / Sam Hollis
 The Colossus of New York (1958 - Dr. Henry Spensser
 The Fugitive Kind (1960) - David Cutrere
 Gammera the Invincible (1966) - J.T. Standish

Television

 Hallmark Hall of Fame (1951)
 The Web (1951)
 Omnibus (1952)
 The Motorola Television Hour (1953-1954)
 Robert Montgomery Presents (1951-1955)
 The Philco Television Playhouse (1948-1955) - Harry Madden / Colonel Brandon / Monroe Stahr / Fitzwilliam Darcy
 Alfred Hitchcock Presents (1956-1957) - Charles Hendricks / Arthur Clymer
 The United States Steel Hour (1954-1958) - Tallien / Luvborg
 Studio One (1949-1958) - Chad Hammond / Emcee / Simon Dow / Kurt Meissner / John D'Arcy / John Brooke / John Brooks / Sanin / Reverend Arthur Dimmesdale / Colin Langford
 Kraft Television Theatre (1947-1958) - Edward Rochester
 Playhouse 90 (1957-1959) - Lord Mark / John Parsons Cook
 General Electric Theater (1957-1959) - King Saul / Brandisher
 Play of the Week (1960, episode: "The Potting Shed")
 Thriller (1960-1962) - George Machik / Dr. Ralph Mitchell
 The DuPont Show of the Week  (1962) - Judge Advocate
 The Secret Storm - Arthur Rysdale #2 (1962-1964)
 Dark Shadows (1966) - James Blair
 ABC Stage 67 (1967) - Ed Bartlett

Stage

 Right Next to Broadway (1944)
 A Flag Is Born (1946)
 The Enchanted (1950)
 Pride's Crossing (1950)
 One Eye Closed (1954)
 The Devils (1965)
 The Grass Harp (1971)
 Murderous Angels (1972)

References

External links
 
 
 

American male film actors
American male stage actors
American male television actors
1918 births
1975 deaths
People from Haleyville, Alabama
20th-century American male actors
Male actors from Alabama